The Thanet Belle was a named train run by the Southern Region of British Railways from 1948 until it was withdrawn in 1958 due to the electrification of the route.

The train, composed of Pullman stock, had its origins in  the Thanet Pullman Limited, introduced by the South Eastern and Chatham Railway in July 1921 but withdrawn in 1928.

The Thanet Belle was usually hauled by a West Country class or Battle of Britain class locomotive. 

The Canterbury service was withdrawn after only one year, but the new name for the train was retained.

The use of the name Kentish Belle was discontinued after 1958 because of the impending completion of the first phase of the "Kent Coast Electrification" in 1959.

See also
List of named passenger trains of the United Kingdom

References 

Named passenger trains of British Rail
Pullman Car Company (UK)
Railway services introduced in 1948
Railway services discontinued in 1958